Larker may refer to:

Norm Larker (1930–2007), American Major League baseball player
a 6-rowed malting barley variety